{{Infobox person
| name = Yan Frenkel
| honorific_suffix = 
| image = Yan Frenkel.jpg
| birth_name = 
| birth_date = November 21, 1920
| birth_place = Kyiv, Ukrainian SSR
| death_date = 
| death_place = Riga, Latvian SSR, Soviet Union
| resting_place = Novodevichy Cemetery, Moscow
| occupation = Composer, singer, violinist, pianist, actor
| title = People's Artist of the USSR 
| awards = USSR State Prize 
| notable_works = Zhuravli 
}}
Yan Abramovich Frenkel (November 21, 1920, Kyiv – August 25, 1989, Riga, USSR) was a popular Soviet Ukrainian composer and performer of Jewish descent.

Biography
Yan Frenkel was a  Russian Soviet composer born in Kyiv, Ukraine. He was originally taught violin by his father, and later studied classical violin at the Kiev Conservatory under , and the piano. During the Second World War he was evacuated to Orenburg, where he entered at the Orenburg Antiaircraft Military School (Zenitnoe Uchilishche), and played the violin in the orchestra of the Avrora Cinema. In 1942 served at the front lines, was wounded. After the hospital, since 1943 played in the military orchestra. или в 1918/1919 году After the war, since 1946 he lived in Moscow, where he wrote orchestral arrangements and played the violin in small orchestras.

He began composing songs in the 1960s. His first was the song Gody ('The Years'), written to lyrics by Mark Lisianski. During his later career he worked in collaboration with many prominent Soviet musicians, including Mikhail Tanich, Igor Shaferan, and the husband and wife team Konstantin Vanshenkin and ]. Thanks to Mark Bernes his song Zhuravli ('The Cranes', lyrics by Rasul Gamzatov) became a major hit. Frenkel gave concerts in which he performed his own music. During these concerts the audience would generally join in. His songs were included in the repertoire of many Soviet performers. He also appeared in the movie The Elusive Avengers, for which he composed a score.

Yan Frenkel died on August 25, 1989 in Riga (as foreshadowed in his song Avgust ('August') to the lyrics of Inna Goff). His wife Natalia died in the mid-1990s, but his daughter Nina has lived in Italy since the 1980s. His grandson Ian Frenkel is a musician (pianist and arranger) in the United States Coast Guard Band.

Trivia
As reported by composer's fan site, members of Soviet ruling bureaucracy orchestrated a campaign against 'The Cranes', citing the song's religious undertones. The case was elevated all the way to the Soviet leader Leonid Brezhnev, who decreed "acceptable to perform, but not too often".

Frenkel was the prototype for Gena the Crocodile, a fictional, friendly crocodile in the series of popular animation films Gena the Crocodile, Cheburashka and Shapoklyak.

Selected filmographyAdventures of the Yellow Suitcase (1970)The Crown of the Russian Empire, or Once Again the Elusive Avengers (1971)Incorrigible Liar'' (1973)

References

External links
 Yan Frenkel's tomb

Sources
 The original version of this page was translated from the corresponding page in the Russian language Wikipedia
 Yan Frenkel (fansite in Russian)

1920 births
1989 deaths
Musicians from Kyiv
Ukrainian Jews
Jewish classical composers
Soviet male composers
20th-century classical composers
Male classical composers
People's Artists of the USSR
People's Artists of the RSFSR
Recipients of the Order of Friendship of Peoples
Recipients of the USSR State Prize
Soviet Jews
Deaths from lung cancer
20th-century male musicians